

203001–203100 

|-bgcolor=#f2f2f2
| colspan=4 align=center | 
|}

203101–203200 

|-bgcolor=#f2f2f2
| colspan=4 align=center | 
|}

203201–203300 

|-bgcolor=#f2f2f2
| colspan=4 align=center | 
|}

203301–203400 

|-bgcolor=#f2f2f2
| colspan=4 align=center | 
|}

203401–203500 

|-bgcolor=#f2f2f2
| colspan=4 align=center | 
|}

203501–203600 

|-bgcolor=#f2f2f2
| colspan=4 align=center | 
|}

203601–203700 

|-id=602
| 203602 Danjoyce || 2002 ED || Daniel P. Joyce (born 1948), an American precision mirror maker and astronomy enthusiast who has been the president of the Chicago Astronomical Society || 
|}

203701–203800 

|-id=773
| 203773 Magyarics ||  || Rudolf Magyarics (born 1960), friend of Slovak astronomer Stefan Kürti, who was an early observer of this main-belt asteroid || 
|}

203801–203900 

|-id=823
| 203823 Zdanavicius ||  || Kazimieras Zdanavičius (born 1938), Lithuanian astronomer and discoverer of minor planets, and leading researcher at the Institute of Theoretical Physics and Astronomy in Vilnius || 
|}

203901–204000 

|-bgcolor=#f2f2f2
| colspan=4 align=center | 
|}

References 

203001-204000